Mario González Montesinos (born August 2, 1975 in Havana, Cuba) is a former international breaststroke swimmer from Cuba, who participated in two consecutive Summer Olympics for his native country, starting in 1992. His best results were a gold medal at the Panamerican Games 1991 Havana in Havana and a tenth place  at the 1996 Summer Olympics in Atlanta, Georgia both in the Men's 200m Breaststroke.

At the 1993 Central American and Caribbean Games, he set Championship Records in both the 100 and 200 breaststrokes (1:03.27 and 2:17.76). As of 2009, these are still the Games records.

References

External links

1975 births
Living people
Cuban male swimmers
Male breaststroke swimmers
Pan American Games gold medalists for Cuba
Swimmers at the 1991 Pan American Games
Swimmers at the 1992 Summer Olympics
Swimmers at the 1996 Summer Olympics
Swimmers at the 1999 Pan American Games
Olympic swimmers of Cuba
Sportspeople from Havana
Pan American Games medalists in swimming
Universiade medalists in swimming
Central American and Caribbean Games gold medalists for Cuba
Competitors at the 1993 Central American and Caribbean Games
Universiade gold medalists for Cuba
Universiade bronze medalists for Cuba
Central American and Caribbean Games medalists in swimming
Medalists at the 1991 Pan American Games
20th-century Cuban people